Moshik Temkin is a historian. He has been based at the Harvard Kennedy School since 2009. He has also been the Johnson and Johnson Chair in Leadership and History at Schwarzman College, Tsinghua University.

Works
The Sacco-Vanzetti Affair: America on Trial (2009)

Warriors, Rebels, and Saints. The Art of Leadership from Machiavelli to Malcolm X (2023)
Undesirables: Travel Control and Surveillance in an Age of Global Politics (upcoming)

References

Living people
Harvard Kennedy School faculty
Historians of the United States
Academic staff of Tsinghua University
Year of birth missing (living people)